City View Hotel is a heritage-listed hotel at 277 Brisbane Street, Ipswich, City of Ipswich, Queensland, Australia. It was designed by George Brockwell Gill and built . It was added to the Queensland Heritage Register on 21 October 1992.

History 
The City View Hotel is a two-storey brick building, believed to have been completed in 1908. The architect was George Brockwell Gill. The site was a difficult triangular one adjoining a deep railway cutting excavated in 1875. Gill produced a skilful solution to the problem, locating an octagonal two-storey "tower" or bay on the apex to disguise the sharp truncation of the building, while the front facade presents as a traditional two-storey verandahed hotel. The hotel was built for T. Humphreys and the first manager was H. Hutting. The name refers to the hotel's position on the edge of the Ipswich CBD. In the 1980s, some of the brickwork was painted and a beer garden structure was erected on the western end. A two-storeyed brick bathroom and toilet annexe was built in the rear courtyard sometime between 1960 and 1980.

In December 2014, the hotel closed its public bar, citing falling patronage due to drink driving laws, anti-smoking legislation and hard economic times. However, the hotel continues to operate its accommodation and function businesses and might open a restaurant.

Description 

The hotel is a two-storeyed brick building with a corrugated galvanised iron hipped roof. On the eastern end is an attached two-storey octagonal tower with ground-level porch. Extensive alterations have been made to the lounge bar to create a "cabaret-style" interior linked through the southern wall to a timber-framed single storey extension. A two-storeyed kitchen-domestics' wing extends at the rear completing the L-shape of the original building.

Heritage listing 
City View Hotel was listed on the Queensland Heritage Register on 21 October 1992 having satisfied the following criteria.

The place is important in demonstrating the principal characteristics of a particular class of cultural places.

It demonstrates the principal characteristics of a Federation-era provincial hotel.

The place is important because of its aesthetic significance.

Built , the City View Hotel is a well-detailed brick hotel which exhibits aesthetic characteristics valued by the community. It is prominently positioned at a major intersection and has landmark qualities.

The place has a special association with the life or work of a particular person, group or organisation of importance in Queensland's history.

It is the design of an important architect George Brockwell Gill and is a skilful and typical example of his well-detailed work.

References

Attribution

External links 

Queensland Heritage Register
West Ipswich, Queensland
Hotels in Queensland
Articles incorporating text from the Queensland Heritage Register
1908 establishments in Australia